North Union is an unincorporated community in Union Township, Montgomery County, in the U.S. state of Indiana.

History
A post office was established at North Union in 1871, and remained in operation until it was discontinued in 1899.

Geography

References

Unincorporated communities in Montgomery County, Indiana
Unincorporated communities in Indiana